Abdullah ibn Unais was a companion (Sahaba) of the Islamic prophet Muhammad. He participated in several military campaigns ordered by Muhammad. The first was to kill Khaled bin Sufyan Al-Hathali who belonged to the Banu Lahyan tribe. Muhammad said that he was planning on attacking Madinah and inciting the people of Nakhla and Uranah to attack him. Therefore he sent Abdullah ibn Unais to assassinate him in 625 during the Expedition of Abdullah Ibn Unais.

Abdullah ibn Unais found Hudayr in the company of his wife, when asked about his identity. Unais replied, "I am an Arab tribesman who has heard of you and the army you are raising to fight Muhammad, so I have come to join your ranks."

Then Muhammad sent him on the Expedition of Al Raji.  Some men requested that Muhammad send instructors to teach them Islam,   but the men were bribed by the two tribes of Khuzaymah who wanted revenge for the assassination of Khalid bin Sufyan by Muhammad's followers.

See also

List of battles of Muhammad

References

Year of birth unknown
Year of death unknown
Date of birth unknown
Date of death unknown
Place of birth unknown
Place of death unknown
Sahabah hadith narrators